Byron Karrys (1926 – August 20, 1981) was a Canadian football player who played for the Toronto Argonauts. He won the Grey Cup with the Argonauts in 1945, 1946, 1947, and 1950. He died after an illness in 1981. His brother, Steve Karrys also played football for the Argonauts.

References

1926 births
1981 deaths
Players of Canadian football from Ontario
Canadian football people from Toronto
Toronto Argonauts players